Infantry is the largest formation of the Singapore Army, comprising seven active battalions—the 1st, 2nd, 3rd, 5th, 6th, 8th and 9th Battalions, Singapore Infantry Regiment (SIR)—based in Clementi Camp, Kranji Camp III, Maju Camp, Mandai Hill Camp, Selarang Camp and, an undisclosed number of reservist battalions. The Infantry formation shares the same command as that of the Singapore Army's 9th Division.

History
The Infantry formation started with the creation of the 1st Battalion, Singapore Infantry Regiment (1 SIR) on 12 March 1957 when Singapore was moving towards self-government. On 4 March 1957, young men born and raised in Singapore were recruited to serve in 1 SIR. Out of 1,420 applicants, only 237 were accepted for training. 1 SIR was intended to be combined with another battalion to form a regiment.

After Singapore's self-governance in 1959, 1 SIR replaced the Gurkha Contingent for guard mounting at the Istana, the official residence of the president of Singapore. Two years later, 1 SIR received its regimental colours. In 1962, the 2nd Battalion, Singapore Infantry Regiment (2 SIR) was formed.

From 1963 to 1965, when Singapore was part of Malaysia, the Singapore Infantry Regiment was renamed the Malaysian Infantry Regiment. The two battalions were called to serve during the Indonesia–Malaysia confrontation, with 1 SIR and 2 SIR deployed to Sebatik Island, Sabah and Labis, Johor respectively.

When Singapore gained independence in 1965, the regiment was renamed back to the Singapore Infantry Regiment. Two years later, two more battalions—3 SIR and 4 SIR—were formed when National Service (NS) was introduced in Singapore. Over the years, four more battalions—5 SIR, 6 SIR, 7 SIR and 8 SIR—were created. In 1977 and 1978, 7 SIR and 8 SIR were converted to the 1st and 2nd Battalions of the Guards formation. 8 SIR was re-created later as an Infantry battalion.

On 15 January 1980, the Singapore Army set up the HQ Infantry to oversee all infantry doctrinal and training matters up to the battalion level. On 17 August 2004, the HQ Infantry merged with the 9th Division (9 DIV) to form the HQ 9 DIV/Infantry.

In May 2011, 2 SIR was converted into a motorised infantry battalion, with the Army announcing its plan to convert three more battalions to motorised infantry such that there would be one motorised infantry battalion in each of its three divisions.

4 SIR was dissolved on 3 March 2020 after its last mono-intake became operationally ready on 17 January 2020.

Organisation
There are currently seven active Infantry battalions, of which five—2 SIR, 5 SIR, 6 SIR, 1 SIR and 3 SIR—are each assigned to an Infantry brigade in one of the Army's three combined arms divisions, while the remaining two—8 SIR and 9 SIR—are under the 2nd People's Defence Force.

References

Infantry
Military units and formations of the Cold War
Military units and formations established in 1957